Sultan Ismail Al Khalidi Ibni Al-Marhum Sultan Sir Ibrahim Al-Masyhur  (28 October 1894 – 10 May 1981) was the 23rd Sultan of Johor and the 3rd Sultan of Modern Johor.

Early life
Tunku Ismail was born on 28 October 1894 at Istana Semayam, Johor Bahru and was the second and eldest surviving son of Tunku Ibrahim (later Sultan Ibrahim) by his first wife, Sultanah Ungku Maimunah binti Ungku Abdul Majid. He was made the Tunku Mahkota of Johor on 2 November 1895, when Tunku Ibrahim was installed as the Sultan of Johor following Sultan Abu Bakar's death. He started his early education in a Malay school in Johor Bahru. In 1904, He was sent to England to attend Rose Hill School in Tunbrdige Wells, Kent and Aldeburgh Lodge School in Suffolk as well as Roydon Hall in Norfolk and Christ Church in Oxford; his brothers Tunku Abu Bakar and Tunku Ahmad as well as his five friends, including Onn Jaafar later followed suit. In 1910, Tunku Ismail, accompanied by Onn Jaafar, returned to Johor and spent three years in Perak, where they were enrolled into the Malay College Kuala Kangsar. In 1913, He was once again sent to England to receive his tertiary education in a boarding school; his brothers again later followed suit until 5 March 1920.

Regent
Tunku Ismail was made the state's regent to take care of state affairs in 1928 as Sultan Ibrahim began to spend more time travelling overseas. In 1937, Tunku Ismail appointed a state executive councillor and a family acquaintance, Onn Jaafar as his private secretary and entrusted him to run the Johore Pavilion at the world fair in San Francisco the following year. Upon Onn's return from San Francisco, Tunku Ismail invited Onn to resume his former duties, which he accepted. Shortly before the Japanese armies occupied Johor during the Japanese Invasion of Malaya, Tunku Ismail fled to England for fear that the Japanese military government may manipulate him onto the throne in his father's stead.

Tunku Ismail returned to Johor after the war and was confronted with Malay nationalist movements which had erupted as a result of the rulers' dissatisfaction with the Malayan Union scheme. While Sultan Ibrahim faced widespread criticisms from the Malay grassroots and nationalist leaders due to his initial willingness to sign the Malayan Union scheme treaties with Sir Harold MacMichael, Tunku Ismail maintained a neutral relations between the British government and the Malay nationalist leaders. Nevertheless, Tunku Ismail officiated the opening ceremony of the United Malays National Organisation's (UMNO) first congress which was held at Istana Besar in May 1946 while Sultan Ibrahim was residing in London.

Tunku Ismail took over the responsibility to state affairs during the late 1940s and 1950s, and presented upon his father's behalf at official functions. On 27 August 1957, Tunku Ismail was one of the nine royal signatories at the royal signing ceremony of the Malaya's Federal Constitution. Nevertheless, he faced mild opposition from a few nationalist leaders in Johor, notably Ungku Abdullah, the party leader of Persatuan Kebangsaan Melayu Johor (PKMJ), a nationalist party that advocated Johor's secession from Malaya. A few days before signing the Federal constitution, Ungku Abdullah cabled to Sultan Ibrahim to boycott the signing ceremony, who notified Ungku Abdullah that he had since delegated the state's executive powers to Tunku Ismail. Ungku Abdullah called for Tunku Ismail to boycott the signing ceremony, who quickly turned down his calls.

Sultan of Johor
Tunku Ismail succeeded his father as the Sultan of Johor on 8 May 1959. He was crowned at Throne Room of the Istana Besar, Johor Bahru on 10 February 1960. The Sultan was known to be very close to his subjects; he made annual trips to visit selected villages in all eight districts of Johor and frequently acquainted himself with the civil servants working for the state government.

Succession issue
On 10 August 1961, he stripped his eldest son Tunku Mahmood Iskandar, of the post of Tunku Mahkota due to misconduct–although he was given the post of Raja Muda on 1 December 1966. His second son, Tunku Abdul Rahman (1933–1989) became the Tunku Mahkota instead. However, shortly before his death in April 1981, Sultan Ismail reappointed Tunku Iskandar as the Tunku Mahkota, who succeeded him the following month.

Personal life
A meek and quiet ruler by nature, Sultan Ismail was an animal lover and was instrumental in the setting up of the Johor Zoo. He also had a collection of wild animals ranging from deers to crocodiles. Among the Chinese community in Johor, he was known affectionately as "Lau Sultan", literally meaning "an old or elderly Sultan".

Sultan Ismail married twice. Both wives served as Sultanahs of Johor. They were:
 Sultanah Ungku Tun Aminah binti Ungku Ahmad (born 5 February 1905-14 September 1977), a second cousin of the Sultan, married on 30 August 1920. Sultanah Aminah died in a road accident in 1977. He had seven children with her, only three of whom survived into adulthood:
 Tunku Abdul Jalil (born 1924-1925)
 Tunku Kalthum Maimunah (born 1927-1930)
 Tunku Abdul Rahman (born 1930-1930)
 Tunku Mahmood Iskandar (Sultan of Johor) (born 1932-2010)
 Tunku Abdul Rahman (Tunku Bendahara of Johor) (born 1933-1989)
 Tunku Helen (born 1936-1937)
 Tunku Tun Maimunah (Tunku Gedong) (born 1939-2012)

 Sultanah Tengku Nora binti Tengku Panglima Raja Ahmad (born 10 October 1937), member of the  Kelantanese royal household, married on 13 November 1977. She is the sister of Tengku Zanariah (next Sultanah), the spouse of Sultan Iskandar.

He was the first Chancellor of Universiti Teknologi Malaysia when the institution was established in 1975.

In August 1977, both Sultan Ismail and his wife, Ungku Tun Aminah binti Ungku Ahmad, met with a car accident in Kulai. While she was permanently left in a vegetative state until her death a month later owing to brain damage, the sultan escaped with only minor injuries. Nevertheless, the ordeal passed rather quickly, and Sultan Ismail remarried in November 1977 to Tengku Nora. Tengku Nora was subsequently crowned as Sultanah the following October 1978.

Death
Sultan Ismail died on 10 May 1981 at 6:12 pm at the Royal Ward Hospital Besar, Johor Bahru after being admitted two weeks earlier following an illness at the age 86. His death was only officially announced at 8:45 pm by Menteri Besar of Johor Tan Sri Dato' Haji Othman Saat. He was brought to the Istana Besar, Johor Bahru for laying in state and is buried in the Mahmoodiah Royal Mausoleum the next day. His son the Tunku Mahkota of Johor Tunku Mahmood Iskandar was proclaimed as the next Sultan of Johor also on 11 May.

Legacy
Several institutions and places were named after Sultan Ismail, including:

 Sultan Ismail Road, Kuala Lumpur
 Sultan Ismail Bridge, Muar
 Sultan Ismail International Airport, Senai
 Sultan Ismail Library, Larkin
 Sultan Ismail Mosque, Universiti Teknologi Malaysia
 Sultan Ismail Jamek Mosque, Batu Pahat
 Sultan Ismail Specialist Hospital, Taman Austin Perdana, Johor Bahru
 S.M.K. Sultan Ismail, a secondary school in Johor Bahru
 Sultan Ismail Building in Kota Iskandar, Iskandar Puteri

Honours

Johor honours 
  First Class (D.K.I.) (1920) and Grand Master (1959) of the Royal Family Order of Johor
  First Class (S.P.M.J.) (1941) and Grand Master (1959) of the Order of the Crown of Johor
  First Class Sultan Ibrahim Medal (P.S.I.) (1928)

Honours of Malaya
  : 
 Grand Commander of the Order of the Defender of the Realm (S.M.N.) - Tun (1958)
 Recipient of the Order of the Crown of the Realm (D.M.N.) (1960)
  :
  Recipient of the Malaysian Commemorative Medal (Gold) (PPM) (1965)
  :
  Recipient of the Royal Family Order or Star of Yunus (DK)
  Knight Grand Commander of the Order of the Crown of Kelantan (SPMK) – Dato'
 :
  First Class Member of the first class of the Family Order of Terengganu (DK)
 :
  First Class of the Royal Family Order of Selangor (DK I) (1975)
 :
  First Class Member of the Family Order of the Crown of Indra of Pahang (DK I) (1968)
 :
  Recipient of the Royal Family Order of Perak (DK) — currently:

Foreign honours
 :
  Family Order of Brunei 1st Class (DK) – Dato Laila Utama (1958)
 
 Grand Officer of the Order of the Star of Romania (16 July 1920)
 
 Knight Grand Cross of the Order of the Crown of Thailand (21 July 1925)
 
 Honorary Companion of the Order of St Michael and St George (CMG) (1 January 1926)
 Recipient of the King George V Silver Jubilee Medal (6 May 1935)
 Knight Commander of the Order of the British Empire (KBE) - Sir (11 May 1938)
 Recipient of the King George VI Coronation Medal (12 May 1937)
 Recipient of the Queen Elizabeth II Coronation Medal (2 June 1953)
 
 Grand Officer of the Order of the Crown of Italy (1938)

Notes

References

 Andressen, PaulMads Lange fra Bali: Og Hans Efterslaegt Sultanerne af Johor, published by Odense Universitetsforlag, 1992, 
 Bayly, Christopher Alan; Harper, Timothy Norman, Forgotten Armies: The Fall of British Asia, 1941-1945, Harvard University Press, 2005, 
 Colonial Reports - Annual, by Great Britain Colonial Office, published by H.M. Stationery Office, 1939
 Information Malaysia, published by Berita Publications Sdn. Bhd., 1985
 Kratoska, Peter H., South East Asia, Colonial History: Peaceful Transitions to Independence (1945–1963), Taylor & Francis, 2001, 
 Makepeace, Walter; Brooke, Gilbert Edward, One Hundred Years of Singapore: Being Some Account of the capital of the Straits Settlements from its foundation by Sir Stamford Raffles on the 6th February 1819 to the 6th February 1919, published by J. Murray, 1921
 Martin, Frederick; Keltie, John Scott; Anderson, Parker Isaac; Renwick, Mortimer Epstein; Steinberg, Sigfrid Henry; Paxton, John; Turner, Barry, The Statesman's Year-book: Statistical and Historical Annual of the States of the World for the Year 1981-1982, published by St. Martin's Press, 1981
 
 
 
 
 Schimmel, Annemarie, Islamic Names: An Introduction, published by Edinburgh University Press, 1989, 
 Nadarajah, Nesalmar, Johore and the Origins of British Control, 1895-1914, published by Arenabuku, 2000
 Nadarajah, K.N, Tengku Ahmad Rithauddeen His Story, published by Pelanduk Publications, 2000, 
 Ong, Pamela Siew Im, One Man's Will: A Portrait of Dato' Sir Onn bin Ja'afar, 1998, 
 Sopiee, Mohamed Noordin, From Malayan Union to Singapore Separation: Political Unification in the Malaysia Region, 1945-65, University Malaya Press, 2005, 

1894 births
1981 deaths
Malaysian Muslims
Malaysian people of Malay descent
Grand Commanders of the Order of the Defender of the Realm
Ismail
First Classes of Royal Family Order of Selangor
Grand Officers of the Order of the Star of Romania
Ismail
Ismail
Malaysian people of Danish descent
Malaysian people of Chinese descent
Honorary Knights Commander of the Order of the British Empire
Honorary Companions of the Order of St Michael and St George
Recipients of the Order of the Crown of the Realm